Samuel Brinsley Ashworth is an American songwriter, producer, and recording artist. Based out of Nashville, Tennessee, he is best known for songs he composed for H.E.R., Leslie Odom Jr., and Sixpence None the Richer.

Early life
Originally from Sacramento, California, Sam Ashworth is the son of Charlie Peacock. Growing up, Sam was steeped in the recording process and surrounded by artists, songwriters, and creative professionals setting the stage for his own career as a songwriter, producer, and recording artist. At age nine, Sam moved from Sacramento to Nashville.

While still in high school, Ashworth wrote "I Won't Stay Long", recorded on Sixpence None the Richer's 1997 self-titled album. By 23, he had produced parts of Michael W. Smith's Healing Rain, for which he received a Grammy nomination and Gold Record.

Career 

Since 2005, Ashworth has released three solo projects as a recording artist starting with his release of the critically acclaimed, full-length record Gonna Get It Wrong Before I Get It Right.

His career's songwriting and production credits span R&B, Americana, folk, pop and EDM, including collaborations with H.E.R., Leslie Odom Jr., Ruby Amanfu, Dierks Bentley, the Civil Wars, the Lone Bellow, Beth Nielsen Chapman, Brett Dennen, and Laidback Luke.

In 2016, he sang and co-wrote the Dutch Top 40 Dance Smash "Million Times" with Rui.

He co-wrote nine songs on H.E.R.'s album, I Used to Know Her, including "Hard Place". The album and received nominations for Album of the Year and Song of the Year respectively. The song was part of a fashion collaboration with Tommy Hilfiger where the lyrics were displayed on merchandise.

He co-wrote four songs on Leslie Odom Jr.'s 2019 album Mr.. The following year, Odom's song "Cold", co-written by Ashworth, was re-released featuring Sia. Odom and Ashworth's song "Speak Now" from the Amazon Original Film One Night in Miami... is nominated in the 2021 Golden Globe Awards for Best Original Song as well as the 2021 Critics' Choice Award for Best Song. It has been lauded by Variety as a potential Oscar nominee for 2021's Best Original Song.

Personal life
In 2017, Ashworth married longtime collaborator and recording artist, Ruby Amanfu. The two reside in Nashville, Tennessee. They attended the 58th Annual Grammy Awards with their three children.

References

External links
 
 

Living people
1980 births
Record producers from California
Singer-songwriters from California
Musicians from Sacramento, California
Musicians from Nashville, Tennessee
Record producers from Tennessee
American male singer-songwriters
Singer-songwriters from Tennessee